This is a list of the songs that E.D.I. Mean has produced.

1999

2Pac + Outlawz – Still I Rise 
 13. "Tattoo Tears"

2000

Tupac Shakur - The Rose That Grew from Concrete 
 16. "In The Event Of My Demise"

Outlawz - Ride wit Us or Collide wit Us 
 1. "Intro"
 6. "Soldier to a General"
 9. "The Nyquil Theory"
 11. "Get Paid" (feat. TQ)
 13. "Mask Down"
 14. "Nobody Cares"
 15. "Geronimo Ji Jaga"
 16. "Maintain"

2001

2Pac - Until the End of Time

Jerzey Mob - Mix Tape Vol. 1 
 9. Please Believe It (feat. Big Syke, Nutt-So & Outlawz)

2002

Kastro & Edi - Blood Brothers 
 1. Makaveli and Kadafi's Intro
 3. No More
 11. So Wrong (feat. Jazze Pha)

Hussein Fatal – FATAL 
 1. Intro (Rough Shit)"
 11. Daddy (feat. Scarface)

2Pac – Better Dayz

Disc 1 
 9. Whatcha Gonna Do? (feat. Outlawz)

Disc 2 
 9. Catchin' Feelins (feat. Outlawz)

Hellraza – Hell Razed Us 
 11. Out of Position
 15. Get Doe (feat. Akwalla, EDI, Fatz)

Young Noble - Noble Justice 
 5. Noble Justice
 7. Over Again (feat. EDI)
 15. Your World (feat. Baby Girl)
 19. Lightz Out (feat. Yukmouth, Lil Zane & Bad Azz)

Outlawz - Worldwide

Thirst & Loch - No Soap No Rags 
 4. 4 Ueva (feat. Outlawz)

Law-n-Orda - Ground Zero 
 8. How the Game Goes

JT the Bigga Figga & Young Noble - Street Warz 
 13. Lights Out (feat. Young Noble, EDI, Bad Azz, Lil Zane)
 14. Part of Life (Napoleon, Tripple 7)

2003

Tupac: Resurrection

2004

2Pac - Loyal to the Game

2005

Mopreme Shakur - Evolution of a Thug N.I.G.G.A. Vol. 1 
 11. Sick Thoughts (feat. Outlawz)

2006

2Pac – Pac's Life 
 8. Don't Sleep (feat. Lil' Scrappy, Nutt-So, Yaki Kadafi & Stormey)

Dead Prez and Outlawz – Can't Sell Dope Forever 
 3. Can't Sell Dope Forever
 6. Thuggin' on the Blokkk
 10. Fork in the Road

2007

2Pac – Nu-Mixx Klazzics Vol. 2 
 11. How Do U Want It [Nu Mixx]

Outlawz - We Want In: The Street LP 
 8. My Life

2009

Outlawz - Outlaw Culture Vol. 2 
 17. Keep Pushin' (feat. Antwon, Skitekk)

2010

EDIDON - The Stash Spot

2013

EDIDON - O.G. Est. 1992

2014

EDIDON - The Hope Dealer

Skitekk - Tape 
 Keep Pushin (feat. Outlawz & Murder Mack)

Production discographies
Hip hop discographies
Discographies of American artists